Midwives in the United States assist childbearing women during pregnancy, labor and birth, and the postpartum period. Some midwives also provide primary care for women including well-woman exams, health promotion, and disease prevention, family planning options, and care for common gynecological concerns. Before the turn of the 20th century, traditional midwives were informally trained and helped deliver almost all births. Today, midwives are professionals who must undergo formal training.  Midwives in the United States formed the Midwifery Education, Regulation, and Association (US-MERA) task force to establish a framework for midwifery.

History

Colonial period 
Childbirth in the United States has traditionally been attended by midwives. During the seventeenth century, the English colonies strictly had women midwives attend childbirths. Town records indicate some well-known midwives including Bridget Fuller (d. 1664) who practiced in the Massachusetts Bay Colony and Mrs. Wiat of Dorchester (d. 1705) who attended over 1,000 births. Others such as Ruth Barnaby (1664–1765) and Elizabeth Phillips (1685–1761) practiced for over forty years. While Elizabeth Phillips was trained in London before continuing her practice in Boston, other midwives such as Ann Eliot may have acquired medical skills through their husbands.

Similarly, in the Dutch colony of New Netherland, women were also established in midwifery practices. In 1633 in New Amsterdam, the colonists constructed a building for the official midwife. This position was held by Mrs. Trynje in 1644 and Hellegond Joris in 1655. Later in 1658, the Dutch councilors of New Amsterdam appointed midwife Hilletje Wilbruch to oversee a new hospital. The English later took over New Amsterdam and renamed it New York, and women continued to be prominent in midwifery.

Modern licensure

Certified Professional Midwife (CPM)
A Certified Professional Midwife (CPM) is a professional independent midwife certified by the North American Registry of Midwives (NARM) and adheres to the Midwives Model of Care. The CPM is the only US credential that requires knowledge and experience for out-of-hospital settings. CPM certification process consists of two steps:
 The validation of midwifery education, through one of the following categories:
 Graduation from a midwifery education program accredited by Midwifery Education Accreditation Council (MEAC).
 NARM's Portfolio Evaluation Process (PEP) pathway. 
 Midwifery licensure of a state approved by NARM.
 Midwifery international education.
 AMCB-certification CNM or CM.
 The NARM Written Examination
CPMs are not required to hold a nursing or other credential; the prerequisite for CPM programs is a high-school degree or equivalent. CPMs must apply for recertification every three years.

As of January 2018, 31 states license CPMs to practice, and ten have impending legislation to create a path to licensure for CPMs. While CPMs do not have prescriptive authority, they administer medications, order laboratory tests, and use devices as allowed by state law.

Covid-19 
During the Covid-19 pandemic a lot of women did not feel comfortable giving birth in a hospital. Which is where the midwives had came in handy, spiking the increase usage of midwives.

Certified Nurse‐Midwife (CNM)

A Certified Nurse‐Midwife (CNM) is a person who has dual education as a registered nurse as well as in midwifery and women's health. CNM's are certified by American Midwifery Certification Board (AMCB). CNMs focus especially on care of women and their families during pregnancy, birth and the postpartum period. CNMs are licensed, and practice in every state.  CNMs provide physical and emotional support during normal birth that can reduce the rate of complications and interventions. CNMs practice in hospital, birth center and home settings, with the majority associated with a hospital or birth center. CNMs practice within a health care system that provides for consultation, collaboration, and referral to physicians and other providers.  Midwives are skilled practitioners who expertly identify conditions which require referral to or consultation with other health care providers. CNMs and Certified Midwives (CMs) also provide well-woman care, including annual exams, birth control, infection checks, and pre-pregnancy counseling.

The CNM education program is a post-baccalaureate program that requires a bachelor's degree and also require a registered nurse (RN) license earned prior to or during the education program.   Since 2010, all CNMs are required to possess a minimum of a graduate degree such as a Master of Science in Nursing (MSN) Master of Science in midwifery (M.S.) or a doctoral degree in nursing, the Doctor of Nursing Practice (DNP). Thus, recent graduates from an accredited CNM education program are awarded at least a master's degree. After completing the required education in nursing and midwifery, CNM candidates are eligible to take the national certifying exam administered by the American Midwifery Certification Board (AMCB).   Recertification takes place is every five years.

All 50 U.S. states license CNMs to practice. In addition, CNMs in all 50 states may prescribe medication, with some limitations and variations.

Certified Midwife (CM)
A Certified Midwife (CM) is a midwife certified by the American Midwifery Certification Board (AMCB). The CM role was created in 1997 in order to expand routes of entry to midwifery education. The CM program includes identical content in midwifery and women's health as the CNM program, but does not require a nursing degree. Currently, the Accreditation Commission for Midwifery Education accredites two programs whose graduates are eligible for either the CNM or CM credential:  the Midwifery Institute at Jefferson and the State University of New York at Downstate.  In both programs, students study midwifery and meet identical ACNM Core Competencies for Basic Midwifery Practice whether they enter midwifery via nursing or any other route.

Education for both the CNM and CM credential is at the post-baccalaureate level. Candidates can apply for admissions to a midwifery education program accredited by the Accreditation Commission for Midwifery Education (ACME) with a bachelor's degree and completion of relevant courses in the sciences. After completion of the didactic and clinical education component, CM candidates earn a master's degree (M.S. and/or M.P.H.) and are eligible to take the national exam toward certification. All CMs must pass the same national certification exam as CNMs, administered by the American Midwifery Certification Board (AMCB). CMs also have a maintenance of certification process required every five years.

CMs are licensed in New Jersey, New York, Rhode Island, Maine, Hawaii and Delaware. CMs may prescribe medication in New York and Rhode Island and will be able to prescribe in Maine when enabling regulations are finalized.  As of January 2018, multiple states are exploring CM licensure in response to shortages of maternity care providers and excellent outcomes associated with midwifery care.  Consultation for adding CMs to the cadre of licensed health professionals is available from the professional association for CNMs/CMs: American College of Nurse-Midwives.

Licensed Midwife (LM)
A Licensed Midwife is a midwife who is licensed to practice in a particular state. As of 2018, licensure for direct-entry midwives, such as Certified Professional Midwives, is available in 31 states. As a licensed midwife you have the option to practice alone or with others.

Granny midwife

History

Granny midwife is a name used to refer to traditional African American midwives in the (typically rural) South. Though the term was used by federal and state governments derogatorily to suggest ignorance, it was also used by the midwives themselves and reclaimed from its derogatory connotation to instead connote the wisdom of age of the granny. Granny midwives were historically lay midwives, but many granny midwives who practice today combine nurse-midwife training with traditional granny midwifery methods.

According to scholar Sharon Robinson, the first black lay midwife arrived in what is now America in 1619. She came from Africa as an enslaved woman and served her community as a midwife and as a physical and spiritual healer. During the reign of slavery in the United States, nearly every large Southern plantation, particularly in South Carolina, had at least one knowledgeable midwife-healer. There is evidence that some freedwomen served as midwives on the plantations of their former masters for no charge to the plantation.  In some cases, plantation masters even rented out their enslaved grannies to neighboring plantations for additional income.

Black midwives were not only common in slave communities, they were also revered as elder healers. Their spiritual and medicinal knowledge gained them special social status in their communities. An important component of granny midwifery was this spiritual knowledge and authority; granny midwives considered themselves to have been spiritually called to the work of healing and midwifery. In South Carolina, Angolan and Kongo constructions of ancestral spirits were important tenets of religion, and granny midwives had unique understandings of the workings of such spirits as they were keepers of spiritual knowledge.

Black lay midwives, or granny midwives, continued providing essential healthcare services to their communities after the abolition of slavery and into the 19th, 20th, and 21st centuries.  At the start of the 20th century,  specifically between 1900 and 1940, the professionalization of obstetrics and gynecology lead to a campaign against all lay midwives by the United States government, but especially the racialized figure of the granny midwife in the American south.  Increased regulatory legislation of lay midwives at the state level between 1900 and 1930 was a key facet of the campaign against granny midwives.

In 1921, the Sheppard-Towner Maternity and Infancy Protection Act afforded federal funds for midwifery training programs to state health departments. States used this money to create training and regulatory programs for lay midwives. By the year 1933, most states passed mandatory birth registration and certificate laws. These laws complicated the work of granny midwives significantly, particularly because they lived in rural settings where illiteracy was common and access to registration filing facilities was more limited than in urban areas. In her dissertation tracing the history of African-American midwifery, scholar Kelena Reid Maxwell examined portrayals of African-American midwives in historical medical journals, the profiles of granny midwives serving in the 30s and 40s in the American South, and many other primary historical documents. She notes that both the training and regulatory programs and mandatory registration and certificate laws jointly contributed to the diminishing number of midwives in places like Macon County, Alabama. In her words, “Macon County, Alabama ran a well-documented campaign against African-American midwives,” and tried to forbid midwives who could not or would not work with the state from practicing altogether.

Another facet of the campaign against midwives and towards greater professionalization and exclusivity in obstetrics was the development and expense of medical technology. Traditional midwifery techniques were constructed as inferior to newly marketed obstetric technology, such as forceps. The United States government developed pamphlets and posters to spread this message, among others, to the American population. Included in such publications was information equating black midwifery with “witchcraft” and “witch doctors” of West Africa, as well as with uncleanliness and ignorance.

State and federal campaigns against lay midwives had deleterious effects on the numbers of practicing midwives in the American South. In her book, Granny Midwives and Black Women Writers: Double-Dutched Readings, scholar Valerie Lee notes that a federal survey of lay midwives in the 1920s found 42,627 predominantly black midwives were practicing in the United States and serving predominantly black communities. These percentages declined somewhat over the next twenty years, though more than 60 percent of black women giving birth in the South in 1937 were still attended by granny midwives, while only 10 percent of white babies births were attended by individuals other than physicians. By 1940, 22 percent of black women were giving birth in hospitals, compared to 56 percent of white women. These numbers would drop dramatically over the next six decades, with granny midwives coming to make up a small minority of birth attendants by the 21st century.

In Listen to me Good, the autobiography of Alabama granny midwife Margaret Charles Smith, as recorded by Linda Janet Holmes, Smith relates her life story as a granny midwife in Alabama in the late twentieth century. Mrs. Smith was licensed to practice midwifery by the state in the late 1940s, after Alabama began to regulate lay midwives. At the time, becoming a registered midwife in Smith's home of Greene County, Alabama required either a state-run month-long lay midwifery training course or a nurse-midwifery education that could take several years. In addition to formally recognized training, granny midwives seeking to be registered had to be recommended and supported by two physicians and demonstrate cleanliness and Christian morals. Mrs. Smith attended her last birth in 1980. Mrs. Smith is an example of a granny midwife who practiced in some capacity up until the end of the last century.

There are several organizations in existence to day that are dedicated to preserving traditional Black midwifery knowledge and increasing the number of Black midwives and healers. Examples of such organizations include the International Center for Traditional Childbearing, located in Portland, Oregon, and Birth in the Tradition: Traditional Midwifery, Monitrice, and Doula Services in the state of Georgia.

Training

Before the professionalization of obstetrics and the United States government campaign to train granny midwives, granny midwives were traditionally trained through apprenticeship after being spiritually called to the profession. It was not uncommon for the calling to midwifery to be passed matrilineally from generation to generation or through some other family tradition. In such cases of apprenticeship, the midwife-in-training might serve as apprentice until her mentor retired, though this was not always the case.

State-sponsored training and regulation of midwives took many different forms and existed to varying degrees in numerous states from the 1900s onwards. 23,456 In Maryland in 1910, lay midwives who had in many cases been practicing for decades were required to be recognized by the state in order to practice.  They had to be able to read and write, to attend at least five confinements under supervision, and to demonstrate to the state board of health that they could attend to normal labor.  The state also had regulatory measures which required doctors to check in after every midwife-assisted birth so that they could identify and report any infractions made by the midwives.

Eight years later in 1918, Alabama passed a law requiring all midwives currently practicing in the state to register with the state board of health and to pass an elementary examination. In response to this new law, the John A. Andrew Hospital of Tuskegee University organized a training program for midwives in Macon County. The program aimed to prepare Macon County midwives for the examination and to equip them with some basic formalized medical training. The course was four weeks in length and the midwives were given lectures by hospital staff and assigned to observe birth in the hospital setting. Other lessons included bed making, food preparation, and cutting the umbilical cord. Mississippi began a similar program of training and regulation after the 1921 passage of the Sheppard-Towner Maternity and Infancy Protection Act, which provided federal funds for such midwifery training programs. Mississippi's training and regulation program focused on community based large meetings or “clubs” where midwives gathered for instruction by public health nurses. A “lead” or “president” midwife would instruct the group in the case of a nurse absence. These club meetings function as a way of initially training the midwives and then sustaining training and development, as well as places of support.

Procedures

Granny midwives use a variety of healing techniques and practices. Historically, granny midwives used both herbal and spiritual remedies. Some granny midwives used the phases of the moon to time pregnancies.

Archeologist Laurie A. Wilkie compared the oral histories of granny midwifery tradition with an archeological record in her article "Expelling frogs and binding babies: conception, gestation and birth in nineteenth-century African American midwifery". Wilkie reports that granny midwives had specific procedures for every stage of the maternal process, from pregnancy to delivery to post partum and oral histories of their traditions are confirmed by archeological artifacts from the nineteenth century. When a woman in a community was pregnant, a granny midwife might have gone and stayed with that woman and her family for weeks or days leading up to her predicted due date. The granny midwife might have helped with the pregnant woman's household chores in addition to caring for the pregnant woman. To prepare for delivery, the granny midwife might have applied lard or Vaseline to an expecting woman's perineum to lessen the likelihood of tearing and ease the passage of the infant.

In her survey of nineteenth century granny midwifery practices, scholar Laura Wilkie describes a ritual performed by granny midwives and expecting families during labor known as “fussing”. According to Wilkie, fussing occurred during the second stage of labor and involved the midwife and the expecting woman's family and friends entering the birth room and adorning the expecting woman's body and hair with fragrant oils. Fussing involved massaging and encouragement. The fragrances served to relax and encourage the mother in her labor while also warding off bad spirits and binding the coming infant's spirit to the physical world. Binding an infant's spirit to people and things in the physical world was believed to keep the spiritual world from reclaiming the infant's spirit.

Granny midwives had specific protocols for newborn infants. When children were born, granny midwives might place charms on the infant such as silver or copper coins to help bind the infant's spirit to its body. Granny midwives also encouraged breastfeeding after birth, as breast milk would pass the mother's wisdom or “mother wit” to her infant. Breast milk served as an additional spiritual binder for the infant, binding its spirit to the mother's. Another common practice among granny midwives was the coating of infant's skin in lard, tallow, or Vaseline. This not only protected the infant's skin from the elements, but it also prevented meconium from adhering to the infant's skin.

Granny midwives used a range of herbal and other remedies. Emmenagogues, used to stimulate menstrual bleeding and as abortifacients, such as tansy, pennyroyal, senna, cottonseed, cedar berries, juniper, ginger, turpentine, asafetida, and camphor were known to and used by granny midwives. Granny midwives were also known to carry castor oil, black pepper tea, goose grease, and other remedies to stimulate labor and aid in contractions.

After the United States began licensing granny midwives, strict rules where put into place about what granny midwives should carry to treat their patients. Scholar Valerie Lee writes that in Florida, midwives registered with the state were mandated to carry such things as baby scales, safety razors, and silver nitrile solution. However, the midwives supplemented these mandates with their own trusted remedies and tools, such as nail files, aspirin, camphor, Vaseline, and collapsible birthing stools.

US Midwifery Education, Regulation, and Association
The US Midwifery Education, Regulation, and Association (US MERA) is made up of individuals from seven national organizations: North American Registry of Midwives (NARM), Midwifery Education Accreditation Council (MEAC), Midwives Alliance of North America (MANA), National Association of Certified Professional Midwives (NACPM), American Midwifery Certification Board (AMCB), Accreditation Commission for Midwifery Education (ACME) and American College of Nurse Midwives (ACNM).  These organizations have worked together since 2011 to “envision and work toward a more cohesive midwifery presence inspired and informed by global midwifery standards and competencies adopted by the International Confederation of Midwives in 2011.” An updated report from a 2016 US MERA Leadership Meeting describes their most recent goals, including recommending "a clear strategic direction through 2020 to focus the collaboration's work".

Statistics 
California had the highest employment of Midwives, and Massachusetts having only 310  as of May 2020.

See also
Birth attendant
Childbirth
Doula
Mamie Odessa Hale
Natural childbirth
CNMs in the United States
Medical Humanities
Sheppard–Towner Act

Notes

Further reading

 Litoff, Judy Barrett.  "An historical overview of midwifery in the United States." Pre-and Peri-natal Psychology Journal 5.1 (1990): 5+ online
 Litoff, Judy Barrett. "Midwives and History." In Rima D. Apple, ed., The History of Women, Health, and Medicine in America: An Encyclopedic Handbook (Garland Publishing, 1990) covers the historiography.

External links
 North American Registry of Midwives
 Midwives Alliance of North America
 National Association of Certified Professional Midwives
 The Association of Midwifery Educators
 American Midwifery Certification Board
 The American College of Nurse-Midwives